100% Synthetic is an EP by American punk rock band The Honor System. It was released in 2001 on Double Zero Records. The album is their second release and the last to feature guitarist Nolan McGuire.

Track listing

Personnel 
 Dan Hanaway – vocals, guitar (left channel)
 Nolan McGuire – guitar (right channel)
 Chris Carr – bass guitar
 Rob DePaola – drums

References

External links 
 []: allmusic information and review

The Honor System (band) EPs
2001 EPs
Double Zero Records EPs